Leny is a townland in County Westmeath, Ireland. This name also applies to the civil parish of Leny. Not to be confused with the Falls of Leny in Scotland.

Leny is one of 10 townlands of the civil parish of Lackan and one of 15 townlands of the civil parish of Leny, both in the barony of Corkaree in the Province of Leinster. The neighbouring townlands are: Carrick and Lackan to the north, Fulmort, Heathland, Kilpatrick and Knockmorris to the east, Rathaniska and Rathbennett to the south and Ballyvade and Cullenhugh to the west.

In the 1911 census of Ireland, there were 6 houses and 40 inhabitants in the townland.

References

External links
The IreAtlas Townland Data Base
Leny at Townlands.ie
 Leny at Logainm.ie

Townlands of County Westmeath